The Judge (French:Le juge) is a 1921 Belgian silent drama film directed by Théo Bergerat and starring Fernand Crommelynck.

Cast
 Fernand Crommelynck as Le juge  
 Auffrey as Madame Orlac  
 Bella Darms as Régine Orlac  
 Coursière as Maître Tabellion  
 Mallé as Lerminier  
 Valdo as Valet de chambre 
 Anna Gody 
 Léopold 
 Jimmy O'Kelly

References

Bibliography
 Philippe Rège. Encyclopedia of French Film Directors, Volume 1. Scarecrow Press, 2009.

External links 
 

1921 films
1920s French-language films
1920s Dutch-language films
Films directed by Théo Bergerat
Dutch silent feature films
Belgian black-and-white films
Belgian drama films
1921 drama films
1920s multilingual films
Belgian multilingual films
Silent drama films